This is a list of films which have placed number one at the weekend box office in Ecuador during 2009.

References
 

2009 in Ecuador
2009
Ecuador